Claire Decker (born February 22, 1995) is an American professional stock car racing driver. Decker was a 2014 participant in the NASCAR Drive for Diversity.

Racing career

Decker raced in northern Wisconsin. She moved from Super Stock cars to Super Late models. Decker raced Super Late models in the TUNDRA touring series of Wisconsin in 2013. She has won the 2014 Dick Trickle 99 (+ 1) super late model race at Marshfield Motor Speedway.

NASCAR
Decker attempted to qualify for her first NASCAR race with her sister Paige Decker and her cousin Natalie Decker in the Martinsville race. Claire and Paige qualified for the race, becoming the second set of sisters to race against each other after Amber Cope and Angela Cope. Natalie's time was not fast enough to make the race. Decker started 31st and finished 27th.

Personal life

Decker is the daughter of Allen Decker who comes from a family of snowmobile racing riders. Four Decker brothers raced snowmobiles in the 1970s; Allen Decker was a factory rider for Bombardier along with teammate Jacques Villeneuve for the 1979-80 season. The Decker family raced snowmobiles against the Danica Patrick family during the 1970s. Sue Decker, Claire's aunt, introduced Danica Patrick's parents.

Her sister Paige Decker also races for her family's Decker Racing team. They are joined on the team by their younger cousin NASCAR Drive for Diversity driver Natalie Decker. Natalie's father (and Claire's uncle) is Chuck Decker, the former owner of the Eagle River Derby Track which hosts the World Championship Snowmobile Derby.

Images

Motorsports career results

NASCAR
(key) (Bold – Pole position awarded by qualifying time. Italics – Pole position earned by points standings or practice time. * – Most laps led.)

Xfinity Series

Camping World Truck Series

 Season still in progress
 Ineligible for series points

References

External links

Decker Racing Official website

University of Wisconsin–Oshkosh alumni
People from Eagle River, Wisconsin
Racing drivers from Wisconsin
Living people
American female racing drivers
NASCAR drivers
1995 births
21st-century American women
ARCA Midwest Tour drivers